Apodasmia rufonigraria is the sole species of Apodasmia, a monotypic genus of geometer moths. It was first described in 1862 (as Fidonia rufonigraria) by Francis Walker, and transferred to Apodasmia by Alfred Jefferis Turner. The species is found in Australia.

References

 Apodasmia at Markku Savela's Lepidoptera and Some Other Life Forms

Geometrinae
Moths of Australia
Moths described in 1862